Oktyabrsky is a rural locality (a settlement) and the administrative center of Oktyabrsky Selsoviet, Zmeinogorsky District, Altai Krai, Russia. The population was 745 as of 2013. There are 14 streets.

Geography 
Oktyabrsky is located 41 km northwest of Zmeinogorsk (the district's administrative centre) by road. Otrada is the nearest rural locality.

References 

Rural localities in Zmeinogorsky District